Robinsons Las Piñas (formerly Robinsons Place Las Piñas) is a shopping mall and mixed-use development in Las Piñas, Philippines. It is located on the north side of Alabang–Zapote Road between CAA Road and Admiral Road in Talon Tres. The mall is owned and managed by Robinsons Land Corporation, the second largest mall operator in the Philippines. The mall opened on October 25, 2014. It is the 39th mall opened by Robinsons in the Philippines and the first and only Robinsons mall in Las Piñas and the whole South Manila area.

Description
Robinsons Las Piñas sits on a  lot on the busy Alabang-Zapote Road in close proximity to several heavily populated and middle-class subdivisions in the south Manila area of Las Piñas and Parañaque such as BF Homes, CAA-BF International, Casimiro Village and BF Resort Village. The two-storey shopping center is anchored by Robinsons staples like Robinsons Department Store, Robinsons Supermarket, Robinsons Appliances and Robinsons MovieWorld. The mall is also part of a mixed-use development that will also consist of a mid-rise residential complex of Robinsons Communities.

References

External links

Shopping malls in Las Piñas
Buildings and structures in Las Piñas
Robinsons Malls
Shopping malls established in 2014